Leon County Emergency Medical Services is located in Tallahassee, Florida beginning service January 1, 2004. Leon County EMS is part of a comprehensive system operating through a cooperative agreement between the City of Tallahassee and Leon County.

Command 
Chief of Emergency Medical Services
1 - Medical director
1 - Deputy Chief of Operations
1 - Deputy Chief of Clinical Affairs
1 - Major of Community Education and Operational Development
6 - Captains as shift supervisors; Logistics, Training, and Communication
14 - Lieutenants as Charge Paramedics
3 - Administrative assistants
2 - Supply technicians
1 - Billing coordinator
87 - field response personnel including paramedics, emergency medical technicians

LCEMS Facility 
The Leon County Emergency Medical Services facility is located at Easterwood Dr at the Public Safety Complex located between Tallahassee's two hospitals, Capital Regional Medical Center and Tallahassee Memorial Healthcare.

System response 
All 9-1-1 calls are received at the Tallahassee Consolidated Dispatch Agency which operates as the center for all EMS systems using the Computerized Medical Priority Dispatch Protocol. That call is triaged for appropriate response and is handled by the EMS Controller, who dispatches the appropriate means of transport determined. EMS dispatchers also keep ambulances informed as they drive to the scene.

Emergency vehicles 
3 - Chevy Suburban
3 - Ford Expeditions
2 - Type III "Cart style" MERV's (Medical Emergency Response Vehicles) that are used at public events, games and parades.
20 - Type I ambulances, All manufactured by Horton Emergency Vehicles of Grove City, OH are equipped with 12 lead EKG capabilities via Lifepak 15.
New for 2015 - 11 Ford F-450 King Cab Ambulances with Horton Emergency Vehicles of Grove City, OH

Operation of vehicles 
LCEMS utilizes 3 ambulances deployed at Station 12 in Chaires, Station 13 in Woodville, and Station 14 in Fort Braden 24 hours a day, 7 days a week. 
Between 7 and 10 ambulances are deployed system-wide with 10 in operation during peak times in both the unincorporated and incorporated areas of Leon County.
Between 4 and 8 ambulances are deployed in the incorporated area on 12-hour shifts using a peak-load staffing and flexible deployment concept. This allows for an increased number of ambulances during times when the need for services is higher and decreased staffing during historically low activity.

Special Operations Unit 
The primary mission of Leon County EMS Special Operations Unit is to provide advanced Mass Casualty Incident Management and Medical Care Capabilities to victims of natural or man made disasters. Most recently, members of the Special Operations Unit have been deployed to Mississippi following Hurricane Katrina and to South Florida following the devastating 2005 Atlantic hurricane season there.

References

External links 
LCEMS Official site
Frazer, Ltd

Government of Tallahassee, Florida
Leon County, Florida
Ambulance services in the United States
Organizations based in Tallahassee, Florida
Emergency services in Florida
Medical and health organizations based in Florida